Charles Marie Philippe Millon (born 13 November 1945) is a French politician who served as Minister of Defence from 1995 to 1997 under Prime Minister Alain Juppé. A former member of the Union for French Democracy (UDF), he represented Ain in the National Assembly (1978–1995; 1997–2001), where he took the presidency of the UDF group over from Jean-Claude Gaudin from 1989 until 1995. Millon also held the mayorship of his native town of Belley from 1977 to 2001 and presidency of the Regional Council of Rhône-Alpes from 1988 to 1999.

As Defence Minister, Millon led the highly sensitive 1997 reform on the professionalisation of the French Armed Forces, which had been decided the year prior by President Jacques Chirac in order to abolish the military service. In 1998, to retain the presidency of the regional council, Millon agreed on being elected with votes from Jean-Marie Le Pen's National Front (FN) and was subsequently expelled from the UDF. He then created his own party, The Right (LD), aiming at federating French liberals and conservatives, which met limited success.

Millon ran in 2001 French municipal elections for Mayor of Lyon and served one term as a municipal councillor for the 3rd arrondissement. He was nominated in 2003 as France's ambassador to the Food and Agriculture Organization (FAO) in Rome, where he advocated for African development. He retained the position until 2007.

Political career
 Governmental functions
 Minister of Defence: 1995–1997

 Electoral mandates
 National Assembly of France
 President of the Union for French Democracy Group in the National Assembly: 1989–1995 (became minister in 1995). Elected in 1989, reelected in 1993.
 Vice-president of the National Assembly: 1986–1988.
 Member of the National Assembly of France for Ain: 1978–1995 (became minister in 1995), 1997–2001 (resignation). Elected in 1978, reelected in 1981, 1986, 1988, 1993, and 1997.

 Regional Council
 President of the Regional Council of Rhône-Alpes: 1988–1999 (resignation). Reelected in 1992 and 1998.
 Regional councillor of Rhône-Alpes: 1978–2003 (resignation). Elected in 1986, reelected in 1992 and 1998.

 General Council
 General councillor of Ain: 1985–1988 (resignation).

 Municipal Council
 Mayor of Belley: 1977–2001. Reelected in 1983, 1989, and 1995.
 Municipal councillor of Belley: 1977–2001. Reelected in 1983, 1989, and 1995.
 Municipal councillor of Lyon: 2001–2008.

 Urban Community Council
 Member of the Urban Community of Lyon: 2001–2008.

References

1945 births
Living people
People from Belley
Union for French Democracy politicians
Republican Party (France) politicians
Right-wing politicians in France
French Ministers of Defence
Deputies for Ain (French Fifth Republic)